Geetika Vidya Ohlyan is an Indian actress. She starred in the crime drama film Soni (2018), in which she portrayed a police officer combating crimes against women in Delhi. She also appeared in the critically acclaimed film Thappad (2020), directed by Anubhav Sinha.

Early life
Ohlyan's father organized theatre festivals in Haryana. She attended the University of Delhi's Kirori Mal College, where she joined her college's theatre society, and directed and wrote scripts during her studies. Ohlyan graduated in 2012 with a degree in English literature. Gautam Arora, a college friend of Ohlyan's and an assistant director on Soni, was the first to suggest her for the part. Ohlyan had already been familiar with the script prior to that because she had done some work from English to Hindi. She said of the script: "On reading it, I instantly fell in love, knowing exactly what the film was trying to say."

Career
She made her acting debut in the crime drama film Soni (2018), in which she portrayed a police officer combating crimes against women in Delhi. She also appeared in the film Thappad (2020), and will be appear in the upcoming film Barah by Barah by director Gaurav Madan.

Ohlyan won a Critics' Choice Film Award for Best Actress for her performance in Soni. WION News said Ohlyan was "breaking all the stereotypes with her roles".

Filmography

Films

Television

Awards and nominations

References

External links 
 

Living people
Indian film actresses
21st-century Indian actresses
Actresses in Hindi cinema
Kirori Mal College alumni
1988 births